This is a list of wars involving the State of Qatar.

References

External links
 Gulf War Guide – Iraq, U.S., UK Operation Desert storm War site with special features on the Gulf War
 Saddam Hussein & the invasion of Kuwait.
 CBC Digital Archives – The 1991 Gulf War
 Master Index of Desert Storm Oral History Interviews by the United States Army Center of Military History

 
Qatar
Wars